Ephysteris cyrenaica is a moth in the family Gelechiidae. It was described by Povolný in 1981. It is found in Libya.

References

Ephysteris
Moths described in 1981